Ashtalakshmi Temple is a popular Hindu temple of Goddesses Ashtalakshmi in Hyderabad, India. This magnificent temple dedicated to Goddess Lakshmi stands distinctly on the outskirts of the city. Amidst value the varied Islamic architectural monuments in the area, this temple has a different style — a touch of south Indian architecture.

Among the Hindu pantheon, the Goddess of wealth, Lakshmi, finds a special place in the hearts of the people for she brings prosperity and happiness as well as salvation. But very few temple have Goddess Lakshmi in her eight splendorous forms.

History
Built under the auspices of the Kanchi Kamakoti Peetam, the temple was consecrated in April 1996. It is one of its kind in the state of Telangana. This temple is located between Dilsukh Nagar and LB Nagar, in Vasavi Colony near Kothapet (NH 9). its very famous

Design
The design and architecture of the Ashtalakshmi temple was borrowed from the one at Chennai. However, several modifications were made while the construction was initiated. The Ashtalakshmi temple is a fine example of a collective endeavor. People from many quarters came forward to donate liberally. It took five years of non-stop work and a total expenditure of Rs 10 million for the magnificent Ashtalakshmi temple to take its present form.

The well-known architect, Padmashri S.M. Ganapati Sthapathi, and M. Mathiyalagan Sthapathi conceived the structure and design. About 134 vigrahams (idols) of lesser-known gods adorn the mahagopuram.

Although built of sand and cement, the Ashtalakshmi temple reveals the remarkable dexterity of the artists. Installed inside are idols of Adilakshmi, Aishwaryalakshmi, Santanalakshmi, Dhanalakshmi, Dhanyalakshmi, Gajalakshmi, Vijayalakshmi and Varalakshmi. Depicting these eight postures, the idols are adorned with gold and kasula Peru necklace and other necklaces. If one is all praise for the richly ornamented idols inside the temple, one is equally agog to see the intricately carved designs on the temple gopuram.

Proposals are in the offing to construct a two-storeyed Kalyana Mandapam at a cost of Rs 15 million and an Archaka nilayam residential quarters for the priests.

The nightly illumination of this enchanting temple is spectacular. Viewed from a distance, it looks like it's made from marble. And on approaching the temple entrance, one is captivated by the tranquility of the surroundings and the all-pervading sweet fragrance of the incense.

Hindu temples in Hyderabad, India
Lakshmi temples